Helmoreus is a genus of fungus weevil which was circumscribed by the New Zealand entomologist Beverley Holloway in 1982. The generic name honors the scientific illustrator Des Helmore. It is found in New Zealand, Australia, and New Caledonia. It is in the tribe Stenocerini.

, species include:
 Helmoreus agathidis 
 Helmoreus curvirostris 
 Helmoreus dugdalei 
 Helmoreus dufouri 
 Helmoreus gressitti 
 Helmoreus nothofagi 
 Helmoreus sharpi 
 Helmoreus watti

References

Anthribidae
Beetles of Oceania